The Way I Loved You may refer to:

 "The Way I Loved You", a song by Taylor Swift from the album Fearless, 2008
 "The Way I Loved You", a song by Selena Gomez & the Scene from the album Kiss & Tell, 2009